Thomas Jahn (born 9 July 1965) is a German film and television director.

Filmography

Feature films
 Knockin' on Heaven's Door (1997)
 Kai Rabe gegen die Vatikankiller (1998)
 Auf Herz und Nieren (2001)
 The Lost Samaritan (2008)
 80 Minutes (2008)
 The Boxer (2009)

TV film
 Herzbeben - Die Nacht, die alles veränderte (1998)

Television series episodes
 Tatort
 Der Dicke
 Balko
 Sperling
 Der Kriminalist
 Da kommt Kalle
 SOKO Rhein-Main
 Einsatz in Hamburg

Awards
Knockin' on Heaven's Door won the Gran Angular Award for Best Film at the 1997 Sitges - Catalan International Film Festival, and the Audience Award and Grand Prize at the 1998 Valenciennes International Festival of Action and Adventure Films. The film was also entered into the 20th Moscow International Film Festival.

References

External links
 

1965 births
Living people
Mass media people from North Rhine-Westphalia
People from Heinsberg (district)
German film directors
German television directors